Edmund Carter may refer to:

 Edmund Carter (cricketer, born 1845) (1845–1923), English cricketer for Oxford University, Victoria and Yorkshire, also rowed in The Boat Race
 Edmund Carter (cricketer, born 1785) (1785–?), English cricketer for the MCC and Hampshire
 Edmund Carter (topographer), English surveyor, topographer and tutor